Ghost in the Shell: Stand Alone Complex is a Japanese anime television series produced by Production I.G and based on Masamune Shirow's manga Ghost in the Shell. It was written and directed by Kenji Kamiyama, with original character design by Hajime Shimomura and a soundtrack by Yoko Kanno. The first season aired from October 2002 to October 2003 and was positively received by critics. A second season, titled Ghost in the Shell: S.A.C. 2nd GIG, aired from January 2004 to January 2005.

The series centers on the members of an elite law enforcement unit known as Public Security Section 9 as they investigate cybercrime and terrorism cases; the cases in the first season often are connected to their pursuit of an elite "Super Class A" hacker and corporate terrorist known only as "The Laughing Man", whose actions end up creating the series' titular "Stand Alone Complex". A series of associated short comic animations, titled Tachikomatic Days, aired after each episode. These shorts star the Tachikoma "think-tanks" from the main series, and they typically relate directly to the story of the preceding Stand Alone Complex episode.

The first season was adapted into a feature-length OVA titled The Laughing Man, which was released in 2005. The series also received video game spin-offs for the PlayStation 2, PlayStation Portable, and mobile phones. 2nd GIG was also later adapted into a feature-length OVA entitled Individual Eleven, which was released in 2006.  Solid State Society, a TV-film sequel to the Stand Alone Complex series, was also released in that year. A new ONA anime series installment titled Ghost in the Shell: SAC_2045 was formally announced in December 2018 and the first season was released on Netflix on 23 April 2020. The second season was released on 23 May 2022. Both seasons consist of 12 episodes each, with Kenji Kamiyama directing one season, and Shinji Aramaki directing the other season.

Plot

Premise

The series takes place in the year 2030, where many people have become cyborgs with prosthetic bodies. While the group investigates various crimes, both seasons feature ongoing investigations into two incidents that embroil the group in corruption within other branches of the Japanese government.

Season 1
The first season of Stand Alone Complex focuses on the Laughing Man incident, wherein a hacktivist ultimately reveals to the Major that he had discovered that several micromachine manufacturing corporations, in association with the Japanese government, suppressed information on an inexpensive cure to a debilitating cyberization disease in order to profit from the more expensive micromachine treatment. Following this, he abducted one of the owners of the company and attempted to force him to reveal the truth on live television, resulting in the hacker live-hacking everyone's vision and cameras at the event to cover his face with the stylized laughing face logo that became synonymous with his image.

His popularity spawned several genuine imitators, resulting in the series' titular Stand Alone Complex. After an investigation by the authorities causes him to resurface in the present, Section 9 discovers these companies and several Japanese politicians later used the Laughing Man's image to garner public support and profit, and they begin a campaign, spearheaded by Togusa and the Major, to disseminate the truth. This ultimately leads to the Cabinet labeling them as domestic terrorists and forcibly disbanding them, resulting in the capture of several members and the apparent death of Motoko Kusanagi. However, it is all a ruse to deceive the government, and the very alive and well members of Section 9 regroup to bring the micromachine corporations and corrupt politicians to justice, resulting in the dissolution of the current Japanese government.

Film
In the film Ghost in the Shell: Stand Alone Complex - Solid State Society, set two years following the resolution of the Individual Eleven incident, the Major has left Section 9, and Togusa is now field commander, leading an investigation into several deaths of refugees from the Siak Republic, which results in the discovery of a government computer system coordinating the kidnappings of 20 thousand abused children who have had their cyberbrains replaced and placing them under the care of several senior citizens made comatose by another government program that takes care of all of their bodily needs.

Their investigation, which brings the Major out of hiding, reveals an entity known as the Puppeteer behind the kidnappings. The Puppeteer is a rhizome formed by the collective will of the senior citizens, and the Siak Republic's intent to use the kidnapped children in their plans leads to their downfall. However, the investigation further reveals that a member of the House of Representatives is also using the children for his nationalistic purposes. Section 9 and the Major infiltrate a welfare center where the MP brainwashes the children, resulting in the Puppeteer revealing that the senior citizens wished to give the children free will in their future, with the politician interfering in that new plan.

Production

Ghost in the Shell: Stand Alone Complex was animated by Production I.G, and produced by Bandai Visual, Bandai Entertainment, Dentsu, Nippon Television Network, Tokuma Shoten, Victor Entertainment, and Manga Entertainment. The series was directed and written by Kenji Kamiyama, with additional screenwriters including Junichi Fujisaku, Yoshiki Sakurai, Shōtarō Suga, Dai Satō, Nobutoshi Terado, Yutaka Ōmatsu, and Yūichirō Matsuka. Masamune Shirow, author of the original Ghost in the Shell manga, provided plot for several episodes, sketches of characters and mechanical designs (including the Tachikoma), and gave his approval to the scripts before production. The series was produced with an 800 million yen investment. Kenji Kamiyama decided to make the anime television series as a "relative" to the manga and film, serving as a separate parallel world from both.

Music

The soundtrack for the series was composed by Yoko Kanno and produced by Victor Entertainment. The first season's opening theme is "Inner Universe" performed by Origa (written by Origa and Shanti Snyder). The lyrics are in Russian, English, and Latin. The first season's ending theme is "Lithium Flower" performed by Scott Matthew (written by Tim Jensen). When the series was later re-broadcast on terrestrial television in Japan, "Inner Universe" was replaced with "GET9", performed by jillmax (written by Tim Jensen), while "Lithium Flower" was replaced with "I Do", written and performed by Ilaria Graziano.

Broadcast

The pay-per-view distribution of Ghost in the Shell: Stand Alone Complex started on SKY PerfecTV!'s Animax channel on 1 October 2002. It ran for 26 episodes until 1 October 2003. The series was later aired on the terrestrial Nippon TV from January to June 2004. A series of associated short comic animations, titled , aired immediately after each episode of the series. These shorts star the Tachikoma "think-tanks" from the main series, and typically relate directly to the story of the preceding Stand Alone Complex episode.

The production of a second season was immediately decided after the first season's TV airing. The second season was initially hinted when Bandai has extended the episode list to 52 episodes at Otakon of 2003. In October 2003, Production I.G officially announced a second season of 26 for the series, which would air at a rate of 2 episodes per month. The second season of Stand Alone Complex, titled Ghost in the Shell: S.A.C. 2nd GIG, aired on Animax from 1 January 2004 to 8 January 2005. It later aired on Nippon TV from April to September 2005.

Ghost in the Shell: Stand Alone Complex was subsequently licensed by Bandai Visual and Manga Entertainment in North America, and Madman Entertainment in Australia. It was broadcast in the United States on Cartoon Network's Adult Swim programming block, in Canada by YTV and in the United Kingdom by AnimeCentral.

On 18 March 2015 it was announced that Stand Alone Complex would receive a full weekly rebroadcasting in Japan on BS11, starting on 1 April 2015. On 25 April 2017, Starz announced that they would be offering episodes of the series for their Video on Demand service starting 1 May 2017.

Related media

OVA

A feature-length OVA titled Ghost in the Shell: Stand Alone Complex - The Laughing Man was released in Japan on 23 September 2005, and in North America on 2 October 2007. The OVA retells the first season of the anime television series with minor alterations to the storyline to accommodate an abbreviated take on the Laughing Man affair. Some additional animation and voice work was also added. Although the Japanese-language version retained the voice cast from the anime series, the English version has a new cast of voice actors. The dialogue recording for the English version was produced by Ocean Productions. A Blu-ray version was released on 22 December 2010.

Ghost in the Shell: S.A.C. 2nd GIG – Individual Eleven is a feature-length OVA which retells the events of S.A.C. 2nd GIG, altered to focus on both the Individual Eleven investigation and the relationship between Hideo Kuze and Motoko Kusanagi. Newly animated scenes and a remixed soundtrack are also included.

A TV-film sequel titled Ghost in the Shell: Stand Alone Complex - Solid State Society was released in 2006.

Video games

Ghost in the Shell: Stand Alone Complex has received two console game spinoffs. The first is Ghost in the Shell: Stand Alone Complex for the PlayStation 2, and was developed by Cavia. It was released on 4 March 2004 in Japan and 8 November 2004 in North America. The second—a sequel to the first—is a PSP title, developed by G-Artist, and is also titled Ghost in the Shell: Stand Alone Complex. It was released in Japan on 15 September 2005 and in North America on 25 October 2005.

Several mobile phone games have been released exclusively to Japan. The first is titled  and was developed by GREE and released on 14 February 2011. The second shares the name of the anime and PlayStation 2 video game, was developed by Mobage and released on 16 November 2011. The game focuses on an unnamed new detective who works for Section 9. The third is a social game also developed by Mobage, titled , and released on 29 March 2012.

On 13 December 2012, Nexon stated it had obtained the rights of Ghost in the Shell: Stand Alone Complex for the purpose of the creation of a massively multiplayer online game. The game was formally announced on 17 September 2015, under the title of Ghost in the Shell: Stand Alone Complex - First Assault Online. The game was a squad-based first-person shooter for Microsoft Windows, developed by Neople and featuring voice performances by the original anime cast. First Assault Online entered early access on Steam on 14 December 2015, but was discontinued in all territories by the end of 2017, due to low player uptake, poor reception, lack of differentation from other games in the genre, and the developers' own dissatisfaction with the quality of the game.

Novels
A three-volume novel series based on the anime television series and collecting self-contained stories was written by staff writer Junichi Fujisaku and illustrated by Kazuto Nakazawa. The novels were published by Tokuma Shoten and distributed by Dark Horse Comics in the United States. The first volume, titled Ghost in the Shell: Stand Alone Complex - The Lost Memory, was released on 21 January 2004 in Japan and on 24 May 2006 in the US. The second volume, Ghost in the Shell: Stand Alone Complex - Revenge of the Cold Machines, was released on 8 July 2004 in Japan and on 26 September 2006 in the US. The third volume, Ghost in the Shell: Stand Alone Complex - White Maze was released on 4 February 2005 in Japan and on 2 January 2007 in the US.

Short Stories
Two short prose stories were released in the Ghost in the Shell: Five New Short Stories prose anthology released in 2017. The first was called Shadow.Net written by Toh Enjoe which references the Puppeteer's actions from the Solid State Society film but could also conceivably be referring to the events in the manga. The second story (which appears as the third story in the collection) was called Soft and White by Kafka Asagiri which revolves around the Laughing Man's actions in the time period between Standalone Complex and 2nd GIG.

Manga
Two manga series based on Stand Alone Complex have been published by Kodansha. The first series, is based on the associated Tachikomatic Days shorts. The manga was drawn by Mayasuki Yamamoto and was launched on 9 December 2009 in Monthly Young Magazine. Eight tankōbon volumes were released.

The second manga series, sharing its name with the television series, was illustrated by Yu Kinutani and launched on 14 December 2009 in Weekly Young Magazine, and later transferred to Monthly Young Magazine on 14 April 2010. The manga is an adaptation of the first season of the anime series. Five tankōbon volumes were released. The first volume subtitled "Episode 1: Section9" was released on 6 April 2010 in Japan and on 24 May 2011 in North America. The second volume subtitiled "Episode 2: Testation" was released on 5 November 2010 in Japan and on 29 November 2011 in North America. The third volume subtitled "Episode 3: Idolater" was released on 5 August 2011 in Japan. The fourth volume subtitled "Episode 4: ¥€$" was released on 6 March 2012 in Japan. The fifth volume subtitled "Episode 5: Not Equal" was released on 6 March 2013 in Japan.

Other
An official guidebook and DVD to the first 19 episodes of the TV series titled Ghost in the Shell: Stand Alone Complex Official Log 1 was released by Bandai and Manga Entertainment on 25 October 2005. The guidebook and DVD contains several interviews from several staff members, reports on several animation techniques and other reports on several concepts of the series. A second guidebook/DVD titled  Ghost in the Shell: Stand Alone Complex Official Log 2 was released on 24 January 2006 featuring background, commentary and examination of the remaining 7 episodes. Another guidebook titled  was published by Tokuma Shoten and released on 31 March 2007. Another guidebook titled Tachikoma's All Memory.

Numerous figurines have been released for Stand Alone Complex versions of the characters with Motoko and Tachikoma being a central focus. Various figures have been produced from CM Corporation, and Kaitendo. Tachikoma figures have been produced by various companies, including one by the Good Smile Company in cooperation with Nendoron. A 1/24-scale plastic model kit of the Tachikoma was produced by Wave in December 2005. Other merchandise includes clothing, key chains, notebooks, patches, bags, posters and body pillows.

Reception
Ghost in the Shell: Stand Alone Complex received mostly positive reviews from critics, who praised the series' high quality of animation and the musical score by Yoko Kanno. In particular, reviewers reacted positively to the world of high-technology that Stand Alone Complex presents, described as "believably futuristic". Lawrence Person from Locus Online wrote that "the world of [Stand Alone Complex] is recognizably our own, or rather, one recognizably extrapolated from modern Japan. While parts of the technology seem unlikely in the time-frame allotted, none seems impossible."

In addition, several reviews mentioned what they perceived to be overarching themes explored in the series as a result of the setting; specifically, the meaning of humanity in a world where the lines between man and machine were becoming increasingly blurred, as well as various societal issues that might emerge as a result of advances in technology.

Reviewers agreed that the main "Laughing Man" storyline was satisfying, characterizing it variously as "interesting", "complex", and "engaging". Reaction to the series' "Stand Alone" episodes, however, was mixed: some reviewers considered these episodes to be boring and, in some cases, the worst episodes of the series, while others contended that they allowed further development of the characters and the futuristic setting.

Certain commentators specifically focused on the series' success or failure in achieving the high standards set by the critically acclaimed 1995 film Ghost in the Shell. Opinion in this regard was divided: although these reviewers took an overall favorable view, some reviews criticized the quality of animation, while others felt that the series' story lacked the depth of the original film. This "lack of depth", however, was attributed to the fact that Stand Alone Complex is an action-oriented series with a limited episode length in which to explore deeper themes.

Bolstering the generally positive reviews of the series, Ghost in the Shell: Stand Alone Complex won an Excellence Prize (Animation Division) at the 2002 Japan Media Arts Festival, a Notable Entry Award at the 2003 Tokyo International Anime Fair, and was featured in June 2004 by Newtype USA, with a "double scoop" cover story. The Japan Media Arts Festival provided a brief summary of Stand Alone Complex, calling it a "completely original television series...entertaining and easy to understand".

Notes

References

Further reading

External links
Ghost in the Shell: Stand Alone Complex official website 
Production I.G's Stand Alone Complex website
Manga Entertainment page: SAC, SAC 2nd Gig, The Laughing Man, Individual Eleven
Official Adult Swim website

2002 anime television series debuts
2004 Japanese novels
2004 Japanese television seasons
2004 anime television series debuts
2005 anime OVAs
2006 anime OVAs
2009 manga
2020 anime ONAs
Action anime and manga
Animated television series reboots
Animax original programming
Anime series based on manga
Bandai Entertainment anime titles
Bandai Visual
Brain transplantation in fiction
Cyberpunk anime and manga
Espionage in anime and manga
Fiction about memory erasure and alteration
Madman Entertainment anime
Postcyberpunk
Production I.G
Refugees and displaced people in fiction
Seinen manga
Stand Alone Complex
Television shows adapted into comics
Television shows adapted into films
Television shows adapted into novels
Television shows adapted into video games
Television series set in the 2030s
Terrorism in fiction
Thriller anime and manga
Toonami